Wāṇa or Wanna (Wāṇə) is the largest town of South Waziristan District in Khyber Pakhtunkhwa province of Pakistan. It is the summer headquarters for the Agency's administration, Tank located in the neighbouring Tank District of Khyber Pakhtunkhwa province being the winter headquarters.

Wanna is also one of the three subdivisions of South Waziristan, along with Ladha and Sarwakai. The subdivision of Wanna is further divided into three tehsils: Wanna, Barmal, and Toi Khwla.

History

Colonial history
During the British Empire period, beginning in the late 19th century, the British established a cantonment on the Wanna Plain which was used as a headquarters by the British forces in South Waziristan until they departed India after the partition in 1947. During their rule, the ferocious Pashtun tribes of Waziristan - part of the Karlanri Tribal Confederation - gave the British much headache. In fact, the British, known then as the 'foreigners' , had to deal with a full-fledged insurgency in Waziristan in the 1930s. At one point during the 1930s, the British had up to 18,000 troops in and around Waziristan, with Wanna being used as the forward headquarters and airbase.

Post-Independence
During 1989 the city underwent a striking increase in Malaria with Azam Warsak suffering the most.

Wanna in the War on Terror

It is currently in the eye of a storm because of the embedded presence of another set of foreigners (Al-Qaeda) who have affiliated themselves with the  Taliban-aligned Ahmadzai Waziris of the Wanna Plain and others in the area . The Pakistan Armed forces have conducted armed operations against these Al-Qaeda members since August 2003 off and on with limited success. Perhaps the town's most violent incident in the War on Terror was the Battle of Wanna which took place in March 2004 and included fighters from the Pakistani Army against Al-Qaeda and Taliban forces. More than 100 armed personnel were killed during the week of the fighting.

Ethnic background of inhabitants
Inhabitants of Wanna are Muslim Pashtuns, primarily Ahmedzai Waziris from the Wazir tribe. Also in South Waziristan Agency are some members of the Mahsud and  Bettani tribes who live in the surroundings of Wanna.

Notable people
 Ali Wazir
 Arif Wazir

References

External links

 Waziristan and Mughal empire
 Nehru in Waziristan
 Sketch map of Waziristan
 Mehsuds and Wazirs, the King-makers in a game of thrones
 Lawrence of Arabia in Waziristan

Populated places in South Waziristan
Waziristan